Dalry Thistle Football Club are a Scottish football club, based in the town of Dalry, Ayrshire. Formed in 1920, they play at Merksworth Park.

The team are managed since June 2021 by Chris Wilson.

Notable players

Jim Leighton - 91 international caps for Scotland, second only to Kenny Dalglish. European Cup Winners' Cup winner with Aberdeen. Also played for Manchester United, Dundee and Hibernian.
Hugh Baird - Airdrie, Leeds United, Aberdeen and Scotland
Ian Ure - Dundee, Arsenal, Manchester United and Scotland.
Pat Liney - Scottish Football League winner with Dundee in 1961–62
Tommy Murray - Scottish Cup winner with Falkirk in 1957.
Tom Brown - Scottish Cup winner with Kilmarnock in 1997 and Scotland B cap.
Euan Ross - Transferred to Stirling in 2022. Was Dalrys 2nd top scorer in a particularly poor 21/22 league campaign.

Honours
Ayrshire Third Division winners: 2001–02
Ayrshire (Ardrossan & Saltcoats Herald) Cup: 1960–61
Ayrshire League (Kerr & Smith) Cup: 1933–34
Ayrshire District (Irvine Times) Cup: 1939–40
Ayrshire District League Champions: 2008–09, 2017–18

References

External links
Club website

 
Football clubs in Scotland
Scottish Junior Football Association clubs
Football in North Ayrshire
Association football clubs established in 1920
1920 establishments in Scotland
Dalry, North Ayrshire
West of Scotland Football League teams